The Okanagan Trail was an inland route to the Fraser Canyon Gold Rush from the Lower Columbia region of the Washington and Oregon Territories in 1858–1859.  The route was essentially the same as that used by the Hudson's Bay Company fur brigades, following the Columbia River to the confluence of the Okanogan River, and then up that river's watercourse via Osoyoos, Skaha (Dog) and Okanagan lakes, then using a pass via Monte Creek to Fort Kamloops, at the confluence of the North and South Thompson rivers.  From there, the route went west down the Thompson River either to the lower gold-bearing bars of the Fraser River between what is now Lytton, British Columbia and Yale, British Columbia, or via Hat Creek and Marble Canyon to the upper Fraser goldfields around present-day Lillooet, British Columbia.  A shorter branch-route to the lower Thompson and lower Fraser Canyon diverged from the main route at the confluence of the Similkameen River and the Okanogan (at present-day Oroville, Washington).  Cayoosh and The Fountains are today's Lillooet, British Columbia and environs.

See also 

Whatcom Trail
Yakima War
Cayuse War
Fraser Canyon War
Dewdney Trail
Douglas Road
Old Cariboo Road
Cariboo Road
Similkameen Trail
River Trail
Hudson's Bay Brigade Trail
Columbia District
Oregon boundary dispute
Oregon Country
Oregon Treaty
Oregon Territory
Fort Vancouver

External links
Detailed history on "Crowsnest Highway" website history page
Indians ambush gold prospectors in McLoughlin Canyon (Okanogan Valley) on July 29, 1858, HistoryLink.org Essay 7614

Further reading
 

History of British Columbia
Historic trails and roads in Washington (state)
Historic trails and roads in British Columbia
Syilx
Gold rush trails and roads